Coosada is a town in Elmore County, Alabama, United States. At the 2020 census, the population was 1,217. It is part of the Montgomery Metropolitan Statistical Area.

History
Coosawda was home to a Creek (Coushatta tribe) village called Koasati in the 18th and early 19th centuries. By invitation, many Chickamauga Cherokee followers of Dragging Canoe fled to the town during—and immediately following—the American War of Independence.  Coosada was the birthplace of the influential Creek leader, William Weatherford, who led the Red Stick uprising of 1813–1814.  After that, the Native American population was removed to the west.  

Frontiersmen from the fledgling United States quickly settled in the area.  The future governor of the state of Alabama, William Wyatt Bibb, migrated to the area at that time.  A land speculator from Georgia, he purchased the land that the village of Koasati occupied, and sub-divided it into lots for sale.  By 1818, the town had a post office and a sawmill.  Following the establishment of the train depot in 1872, the settlement was called "Coosada Station."  Around 1890 the town became simply "Coosada."

Geography
Coosada is located on the Alabama River at (32.504197, -86.334120).

Demographics

Note: The 1880 U.S. Census figure is for the unincorporated community of Coosada Station. Coosada was not incorporated until 1967.

2000 census
At the 2000 census there were 1,382 people, 472 households, and 370 families in the town. The racial makeup of the town was 56.08% White, 42.55% Black or African American, 0.36% Native American, 0.14% Asian, 0.22% from other races, and 0.65% from two or more races. 0.65% of the population were Hispanic or Latino of any race.
Of the 472 households 39.0% had children under the age of 18 living with them, 58.3% were married couples living together, 15.0% had a female householder with no husband present, and 21.6% were non-families. 19.3% of households were one person and 7.8% were one person aged 65 or older. The average household size was 2.93 and the average family size was 3.38.

The age distribution was 31.9% under the age of 18, 8.2% from 18 to 24, 29.1% from 25 to 44, 20.5% from 45 to 64, and 10.3% 65 or older. The median age was 32 years. For every 100 females, there were 95.8 males. For every 100 females age 18 and over, there were 90.1 males.

The median household income was $39,405 and the median family income  was $44,118. Males had a median income of $30,444 versus $22,411 for females. The per capita income for the town was $16,219. About 7.7% of families and 10.9% of the population were below the poverty line, including 17.4% of those under age 18 and 11.7% of those age 65 or over.

2010 census
At the 2010 census there were 1,224 people, 434 households, and 340 families in the town. The racial makeup of the town was 57.7% White, 40.0% Black or African American, 0.4% Native American, 0.2% Asian, 1.1% from other races, and 0.7% from two or more races. 2.9% of the population were Hispanic or Latino of any race. Of the 472 households 32.0% had children under the age of 18 living with them, 54.4% were married couples living together, 17.7% had a female householder with no husband present, and 21.7% were non-families. 18.9% of households were one person and 8.5% were one person aged 65 or older. The average household size was 2.82 and the average family size was 3.19.

The age distribution was 27.0% under the age of 18, 8.0% from 18 to 24, 24.3% from 25 to 44, 27.2% from 45 to 64, and 13.6% 65 or older. The median age was 38.1 years. For every 100 females, there were 96.5 males. For every 100 females age 18 and over, there were 98.4 males.

The median household income was $47,904 and the median family income  was $53,462. Males had a median income of $41,336 versus $24,659 for females. The per capita income for the town was $18,636. About 10.6% of families and 15.5% of the population were below the poverty line, including 18.8% of those under age 18 and 12.7% of those age 65 or over.

2020 census

As of the 2020 United States census, there were 1,217 people, 418 households, and 322 families residing in the town.

Education
It is in the Elmore County Public School System.

Notable people
 William Wyatt Bibb, first governor of Alabama; is buried in the Bibb family cemetery, just outside of Coosada
 George G. McWhorter, member of the Florida Supreme Court from 1885 to 1887
 William Weatherford, Creek chief. Born near Coosada.

References

Notes

External links
 Elmore County Corporate Development website

Towns in Elmore County, Alabama
Towns in Alabama
Montgomery metropolitan area
Alabama placenames of Native American origin